is a Japanese manga series written and illustrated by Yasunori Mitsunaga. It has been serialized in Kodansha's shōnen manga magazine Monthly Shōnen Sirius since September 2019.

Publication
Written and illustrated by Yasunori Mitsunaga, Time Stop Hero started in Kodansha's shōnen manga magazine Monthly Shōnen Sirius on September 26, 2019. Kodansha has collected its chapters into individual tankōbon volumes. The first volume was released on January 9, 2020. As of January 6, 2023, eleven volumes have been released.

In North America, the manga has been licensed for English release by Seven Seas Entertainment.

Volume list

See also
 Princess Resurrection, another manga series by the same author
 Avarth, another manga series by the same author
 Isekai Sniper wa Onna Senshi no Mofumofu Pet, another manga series by the same author

References

External links
  
 

Isekai anime and manga
Kodansha manga
Seven Seas Entertainment titles
Shōnen manga